Karen Balauf Delaney is an American sculptor and teacher.

Delaney attended Radford University in Virginia and taught 3D design at Indiana University of PA, Emmanuel College in Boston and the Anglo-American University in Prague. She heads the Chester County Art Association in West Chester. Her metal sculptures appear in galleries in Austria, International Steel Sculpture Workshop and Symposium, Hungary, and Poland.

References

Links
 Official website
 Karen Delaney at the Chester County Studio Tour

20th-century American sculptors
Living people
Year of birth missing (living people)
21st-century American sculptors
Radford University alumni